Illegal Entry is a 1949 American film noir crime film directed by Frederick De Cordova and starring Howard Duff, Märta Torén and George Brent. The film and its treatment of illegal entry and unlawful residence in the United States is introduced by Watson B. Miller, the commissioner of the Immigration and Naturalization Service under President Harry S. Truman.

Plot
An undercover agent (Howard Duff) attacks an illicit Mexican border immigrant smuggling operation.

Cast
 Howard Duff as Bert Powers
 Märta Torén as Anna Duvak O'Neill
 George Brent as Chief Agent Dan Collins
 Gar Moore as Lee Sloan
 Tom Tully as Nick Gruber
 Paul Stewart as Zack Richards
 Richard Rober as Dutch Lempo
 Joseph Vitale as Joe Bottsy
 James Nolan as Agent Benson
 Clifton Young as Billy Rafferty
 David Clarke as Carl
 Robert Osterloh as Agent Crowthers
 Anthony Caruso as Teague
 Donna Martell as Maria

Reception

Critical response
The New York Times film critic, Bosley Crowther, gave the film a mixed review, "A formidable introduction which features Attorney General Tom Clark and certain Immigration Bureau oficials who bespeak that service well does not camouflage Illegal Entry ... Howard Duff plays this hero in an acceptable rough-and-ready style and Marta Toren is attractive as the girl ... The backgrounds of southern California and Mexico are authentic enough. But the whole picture has the quality of a mechanical, oft-repeated show." The film was given a favorable review in other newspapers including one in the Rushville Republican (Indiana), published on September 27, 1949

References

External links
 
 
 
 

1949 films
1940s crime thriller films
American aviation films
American black-and-white films
American crime thriller films
Film noir
Films about illegal immigration to the United States
Films directed by Frederick de Cordova
Films set in California
Films set in Mexico
Universal Pictures films
1940s English-language films
1940s American films